Diorygma streimannii is a species of script lichen in the family Graphidaceae. Found in Australia, it was formally described as a new species in 2017 by lichenologists Alan W. Archer and John Elix. The type specimen was collected from Cow Bay in Cape Tribulation National Park (Queensland). The species epithet streimannii honours Heinar Streimann (1938–2001), who collected the type and "made important contributions to the study of Australian mosses and lichens".

The lichen is similar to Diorygma rufopruinosum but is distinguished by its black  with white  and by the presence of the lichen product neotricone.

References

streimannii
Lichen species
Lichens described in 2017
Lichens of Australia
Taxa named by Alan W. Archer
Taxa named by John Alan Elix